Byasa crassipes, the black windmill, is a butterfly found in India and Southeast Asia that belongs to the windmills genus, Byasa, comprising tailed black swallowtail butterflies with white spots and red submarginal crescents.

Range
North east India (Manipur), Myanmar (southern Shan states), northern Thailand, northern Laos, northern Vietnam (Tonkin), and possibly southern China.

Status
The black windmill is very rare and is protected by law in India. More information is required on this species.

Description
The wingspan is 110–120 mm. It is a black butterfly which is unmarked except for obscure red spots on the upper hindwing. The tail is red tipped below.

Male upperside: Forewing dark fuliginous (sooty) black, with black veins, a longitudinal streak between the veins and streaks within the cell. Hindwing very narrow anteriorly and much prolonged posteriorly, exterior margin broadly scalloped, tail very broad and short; abdominal margin with a very long folded lappet, which when opened displays a lengthened greyish-white woolly androconial patch; colour dull greyish black, with two upper marginal and two sub-anal lunules, tip of the tail very obscure dusky red. Underside: forewing paler. Hindwing dull black, with the two upper and lower marginal lunules, an irregular-shaped anal lunule, and the tail tip bright crimson. Thorax and abdomen above black; front of head and thorax and abdomen beneath crimson; abdomen beneath with black segmental bands; hind tibiae very thick; antennae and legs black.

Taxonomy
No separate subspecies have been described.

Habits

See also
Papilionidae
List of butterflies of India
List of butterflies of India (Papilionidae)

References

External links
Global Butterfly Information System Syntype text, images

Byasa
Butterflies of Asia
Butterflies described in 1879